António José Alves Ribeiro (born 4 September 1965 in Amarante, Porto District), known as Tozé,  is a Portuguese retired footballer who played as a forward.

External links

1965 births
Living people
People from Amarante, Portugal
Portuguese footballers
Association football forwards
Primeira Liga players
Liga Portugal 2 players
F.C. Penafiel players
Vitória S.C. players
C.S. Marítimo players
S.C. Beira-Mar players
FC Porto players
Gil Vicente F.C. players
S.C. Farense players
Portugal under-21 international footballers
Portugal international footballers
Sportspeople from Porto District